Early Orbison is an album recorded by Roy Orbison on the Monument Records label at the RCA Studio B in Nashville, Tennessee, and released in 1964. Essentially a compilation of songs from his first two Monument albums, it is most noteworthy for containing "Pretty One", the "B" side of Orbison's second Monument single, "Uptown". Many Orbison fans believe "Pretty One" would have been his first major hit had it been promoted as an "A" side. The second song of interest on this album is "Come Back to Me My Love" which Fred Foster, owner of Monument Records and producer of all of Orbison's earliest hits, says was the song which inspired production of the hit arrangement that later became "Only the Lonely".

Track listing

References

Albums produced by Fred Foster
Roy Orbison compilation albums
1964 compilation albums
Monument Records compilation albums